Stanislav Spartakovich Sharov (born 29 May 1995) is a Russian basketball player for the Russian 3x3 national team.

He represented Russian Olympic Committee (ROC) at the 2020 Summer Olympics.

References

1995 births
Living people
3x3 basketball players at the 2020 Summer Olympics
Guards (basketball)
Medalists at the 2020 Summer Olympics
Olympic medalists in 3x3 basketball
Olympic 3x3 basketball players of Russia
People from Gusev
Russian men's basketball players
Russian men's 3x3 basketball players
Basketball players at the 2019 European Games
European Games medalists in basketball
European Games gold medalists for Russia
Olympic silver medalists for the Russian Olympic Committee athletes
Sportspeople from Kaliningrad Oblast